Muhammad Hisham Kabbani (born 28 January 1945) is a Lebanese-American Sunni Sufi Muslim scholar belonging to the Naqsbandi Sufi Order. Kabbani has counseled and advised Muslim leaders to build community resilience against violent extremism. In 2012, the Royal Islamic Strategic Studies Centre named him on The 500 Most Influential Muslims. His notable students include the world-famous boxer Muhammad Ali and former Indonesian President Susilo Bambang Yudhoyono.

Biography

Shaykh Kabbani was born in Beirut, Lebanon.

On the order of Shaykh Nazim, Shaykh Kabbani relocated to the United States in 1990  where he has developed over a dozen Sufi centers focused on Islamic spirituality and cultural enrichment.

He is also the founder and chairman of the Islamic Supreme Council of America (ISCA), a non-profit, non-governmental educational organization dedicated to teaching personal moral excellence. ISCA has spearheaded a number of peace initiatives, hosted notable conferences, actively engages in inter-religious dialogue, and promotes traditional and moderate Islamic views.

Shaykh Muhammad Hisham Kabbani is married to Hajjah Naziha Adil, a descendant of Muhammad, through her paternal and maternal lineages, which includes Shaykh Abdul Qadir Gilani and globally renowned poet Jalaluddin Rumi. Hajjah Naziha is the eldest child of Shaykh Muhammad Nazim Adil (d. 2014), and Hajjah Amina bint Ayesha (d. 2004), a shaykha and Islamic scholar who wrote extensively on lives of the prophets, whose family escaped religious persecution in Tatarstan, Russia.

Activities 
For more than twenty years, Shaykh Hisham and Hajjah Naziha have advanced Shaykh Nazim’s legacy by directing various emergency disaster relief and humanitarian aid projects in Banda Aceh, Indonesia (tsunami relief); NWFP, Pakistan (earthquake relief); Kabul, Afghanistan (modern medical equipment and winter clothing); and Istanbul, Turkey (earthquake relief). The Hajjah Naziha Charity is the natural evolution of their past work to advance those outreach projects dearest to Shaykh Nazim’s heart.

Kabbani also a member of the Elijah Interfaith Institute Board of World Religious Leaders. Shaykh Hisham Kabbani has held meetings with numerous world leaders and has been a key speaker at various conferences, such as the World Economic Forum.

Fatwas
In 2011. Shaykh Kabbani and Homayra Ziad (Islamic Studies, Trinity College, CT), wrote a  fatwa using Quranic exegesis, a review of hadith, and linguistic analysis to determine that the Quran does not condone domestic violence. According to the authors of the fatwa, the broader message of the Qur'an is the promotion of harmony and affection between husband and wife so that they may develop amongst themselves a sacred bond of love and mercy.

Shaykh Kabbani has also written a fatwa on the principles of jihad, which was translated into Arabic and distributed by the US military in Iraq.

Controversy and criticism 
In 1999, Shaykh Kabbani came into conflict with various Muslim groups including the Islamic Society of North America (ISNA), the Council on American-Islamic Relations (CAIR), and the Islamic Circle of North America (ICNA) after he stated that 80 percent of mosques are being run by "extremist ideologies". Muslim organizations responded harshly, stating that Kabbani's remarks "could have a profoundly negative impact on ordinary American Muslims". Shaykh Kabbani plunged into further controversy when he accused Muslims who advise the United States about Islam as being "extremists themselves". When asked during a conference whether he would name the Islamic groups he believed were "extremist", Kabbani answered, "after the program". When subsequently confronted with the question during the end of the discussion, Kabbani refused to answer. In a joint statement pertaining to Shaykh Kabbani's accusations, several Muslim groups said that "Shaykh Kabbani has put the entire American Muslim community under unjustified suspicion. In effect, Shaykh Kabbani is telling government officials that the majority of American Muslims pose a danger to our society."

In his remarks at the State Department that year, Shaykh Kabbani had claimed that 80 percent of the Muslim American population have been introduced to extremist ideology. Shaykh Kabbani claimed the figure was based on his interviews with religious clerics, educators, community members and young Muslims in 114 mosques in the US over an eight-year period (1991-1999).
 Although the "80%" figure has been widely cited by public officials, and has been repeated by several other reports, a fact check by the Washington Post concluded the statistic has not been confirmed by a quantitative, peer-reviewed study or any other type of evidence.

In his 1999 State Department speech, Shaykh Kabbani claimed that while the majority of Muslim Americans have been exposed to violent extremist ideologies, "not all of them agree with it." Later in the question and answer session he reiterated that the majority of the Muslim community which is "peace loving and tolerant" does not support extremism. In a 2000 interview with the Middle East Quarterly, he clarified his position that "the problem of extremism is not confined to the Muslim community...  Extremism is an unwillingness to accept any viewpoint but one's own...  Ideological extremism can result in an act of violence when an individual pursues his ideas to such an extreme that he thinks only his ideas are correct and must therefore be enforced on everyone else."

In 2001 and 2002 Shaykh Kabbani was recognized as one of the few Muslim scholars at that time to have warned of the threat of violent extremism.

In the April 2016 issue of Dabiq Magazine, Salafism-Wahhabism terrorist group the so-called Islamic State of Iraq and the Levant declared him a murtad (or apostate).

Published works

References

External links

HishamKabbani.com
Media Archive of Naqshbandi Haqqani Sufi Order
Official website of the Naqshbandi Haqqani Sufi Way
Website of as-Sunnah Foundation of America
Hajjah Naziha Charity UK
Center for Spirituality and Cultural Advancement, UK
PakNaqshbandi.com

1945 births
Living people
Lebanese emigrants to the United States
American Sufis
People from Beirut